Rob Swearingen (born July 23, 1963) is an American businessman and politician.

Swearingen was born in Oneida County, Wisconsin. He went to Rhinelander High School in Rhinelander, Wisconsin, where  Swearingen and his wife now own the AL-GEN dinner club. Rob was president of the Tavern League of Wisconsin from October 2007 to December 2012. In November 2012, he was elected to the Wisconsin State Assembly as a Republican.

References

Living people
People from Oneida County, Wisconsin
Businesspeople from Wisconsin
Republican Party members of the Wisconsin State Assembly
People from Rhinelander, Wisconsin
1963 births
21st-century American politicians